Seis may refer to:
 Seis, a type of Puerto Rican dance music
 Seis am Schlern, a village in Tyrol, Italy
 Seis, a locality in Lutzhorn, Germany

SEIS may refer to:
 On-Line Encyclopedia of Integer Sequences
 Seed Enterprise Investment Scheme
 Seismic Experiment for Interior Structure, a scientific instrument on board the InSight Mars lander
 , by Mon Laferte (2021); see Mon Laferte discography

See also 
 Sei (disambiguation)
 Seix